Deathchain (originally named Winterwolf) is a Finnish extreme metal band from Kuopio. The band is signed to Dynamic Arts Records and toured Europe with Candlemass and Destruction in late 2005.

Band members

Current
 K.J. Khaos (Kai Jaakkola) - vocals
 Corpse - guitar
 Cult - guitar
 Kuolio - bass
 Kassara - drums

Former
 Possessed Keripukki - bass
 Telaketju - drums
 Rotten - vocals
 Bobby Undertaker - guitar
 C.Void - Backing Vocals

Discography

As Winterwolf
 Death... Will Come Your Way (Demo, 2000)
 Blood for Death (Demo, 2001)
 Cycle of the Werewolf (Studio album, 2009)

As Deathchain
 Poltergeist (Demo, 2002)
 Deadmeat Disciples (2003)
 Deathchain / Deathbound (2005)
 Deathrash Assault (2005)
 Cult of Death (2007)
 Death Eternal (2008)
 Death Gods (2010)
 Ritual Death Metal (2013)

References

External links

 
 Deathchain at Encyclopaedia Metallum
 Deathchain at Last.fm

Finnish death metal musical groups
Finnish heavy metal musical groups
Finnish thrash metal musical groups
Musical groups established in 1997